Wedding photography is a specialty in photography that is primarily focused on the photography of events and activities relating to weddings. It may include other types of portrait photography of the couple before the official wedding day, such as a pre-wedding engagement session (photographs are later used for the couple's wedding invitations). On the wedding day, the photographer(s) will provide portrait photography as well as documentary photography to document the different wedding events and rituals throughout the wedding day(s).

History

Like the technology of photography itself, the practice of wedding photography has evolved and grown since the invention of the photographic art form in 1826 by Joseph Nicéphore Niépce. In fact, an early photograph, recorded some 14 years after the fact, may be a recreation for the camera of the 1840 wedding of Queen Victoria to Prince Albert. However, in the early days of photography, most couples of more humble means did not hire a photographer to record the actual wedding itself. Until the later half of the 19th century, most people didn't pose for formal wedding photos during the wedding. Rather, they might pose for a formal photo in their best clothes before or after a wedding. In the late 1860s, more couples started posing in their wedding clothes or sometimes hired a photographer to come to the wedding venue. (See the gallery at White wedding.)

Due to the nature of the bulky equipment and lighting issues, wedding photography was largely a studio practice for most of the late 19th century. Over time, technology improved, but many couples still might only pose for a single wedding portrait. Wedding albums started becoming more commonplace towards the 1880s, and the photographer would sometimes include the wedding party in the photographs. Often the wedding gifts would be laid out and recorded in the photographs as well.

At the beginning of the 20th century, color photography became available, but was still unreliable and expensive, so most wedding photography was still practiced in black and white. The concept of capturing the wedding "event" came about after the Second World War. Using film roll technology and improved lighting techniques available with the invention of the compact flash bulb, photographers would often show up at a wedding and try to sell the photos later. Despite the initial low quality photographs that often resulted, the competition forced the studio photographers to start working on location.

Initially, professional studio photographers might bring a lot of bulky equipment, thus limiting their ability to record the entire event. Even "candid" photos were more often staged after the ceremony. In the 1970s, the more modern approach to recording the entire wedding event started evolving into the practice as we know it today, including a more "Documentary photography" style of photography.

Technology 
During the film era, photographers favoured colour negative film and medium-format cameras, especially by Hasselblad. Today, many more weddings are photographed with digital SLR cameras as the digital convenience provides quick detection of lighting mistakes and allows creative approaches to be reviewed immediately.

In spite of this trend, some photographers continue to shoot with film as they prefer the film aesthetic, and others are of the opinion that negative film captures more information than digital technology, and has less margin for exposure error. Certainly true in some cases, exposure latitude inherent in a camera's native Raw image format (which allows for more under- and over- exposure than JPEG) varies from manufacturer to manufacturer. All forms of RAW have a degree of exposure latitude which exceeds slide film - to which digital capture is commonly compared.

The introduction of ILC (interchangeable lens cameras) mirrorless camera such as the Fuji XT-2 and the Sony A7 series in 2015 / 2016 is a game-changer for the PJ wedding photographer.  With the introduction of the Nikon D5 it is now possible to capture images in very low light, without the use of a flash.

Technology has evolved with the use of remote triggers and flash synchronization. Wedding photographers are now able to travel light and yet have the ability to use creative lighting.

Approaches

Two approaches to wedding photography are traditional and photojournalistic. Many wedding photographers will fall somewhere in between the extremes represented by these two descriptions.

Traditional wedding photography provides for more classically posed images and a great deal of photographer control during the ceremony.

A Photojournalist style of wedding photography takes its cue from editorial reporting styles and focuses more on candid images with little photographer interaction; a wedding photojournalist typically shoots images quickly using available light or on-camera flash rather than using traditional, formal posing techniques and studio lights.

A third style is a fashion-based approach. In contemporary/fashion-based wedding photography, a photographer will combine candid images of the events of the day with posed images that are inspired by editorial fashion photography This style often involves more innovative and dramatic post-processing of images.

A fourth style that is popular in Asian countries, especially in China, is wedding studio photography (Chinese: 婚纱摄影; pinyin: hūn shā shè yǐng).  Typically, couples will make an appointment with a studio for an in-studio or a location shoot, with support from a hair stylist and make-up artist in addition to the photographer and the couple.  The couple will go through many changes of clothing and backgrounds in a similar manner to the fashion based approach.

The term contemporary wedding photography is used to describe wedding photography that is not of a traditional nature. The emphasis in contemporary photography is to capture the story and atmosphere from the day, so that the viewer has an appreciation of what the wedding was like, rather than a series of pre-determined poses.

Albums, prints, other products, types of photos

A contemporary wedding photographer will usually provide some or all of the following:

Indoor photography at a church, temple, or other private venue during the ceremony and reception.
Outdoor photography (often at a park, beach, or scenic location on the day of the wedding and/or for engagement photos).
Both posed and candid (photojournalistic) shots of the wedding couple and their guests at the religious or civil ceremony, and the reception that follows.
Formal portraiture in the studio (for either the wedding and/or the engagement photos).
Digital services, such as digital prints, slides shows and online galleries.
Albums (either traditional matted albums or the more contemporary flush mount type of album).

The range of deliverables that a wedding photographer presents is varied. There is no standard as to what is included in a wedding coverage or package, so products vary regionally and from across photographers, as do the number of images provided.

Most photographers provide a set of proofs (usually unretouched, edited images) for the clients to view. Photographers may provide hard copy proofs in the form of 4x5 or 4x6 prints, a "magazine" of images with thumbnail sized pictures on multiple pages. Alternatively, they will provide an online proofing gallery. The images will sometimes include a digital watermark/company logo on the images. Some photographers provide these proofs for the client to keep, and some photographers require the client to make final print choices from the proofs and then return them or purchase them at an additional cost.

There are a wide variety of albums and manufacturers available, and photographers may provide traditional matted albums, digitally designed "coffee table" albums, contemporary flush mount albums, hardbound books, scrapbook style albums, or a combination of any of the above. Albums may be included as part of a pre-purchased package, or they may be added as an after-wedding purchase. Not all photographers provide albums; some may prefer to provide prints and/or files and let clients make their own albums.

Most photographers allow clients to purchase additional prints for themselves or their families. Many photographers now provide online sales either through galleries located on their own websites or through partnerships with other vendors. Those vendors typically host the images and provide the back end sales mechanism for the photographer; the photographer sets his or her own prices and the vendor takes a commission or charges a flat fee.

Some photographers also include high resolution photograph files in their packages. These photographers allow their clients limited rights to reproduce the images for their personal use, while retaining the copyright. Not all photographers release files and those who do will most likely charge a premium for them, since releasing files sometimes means giving up any after wedding print or album sales for the most part. In the cases where photographers release the high resolution images they are usually supplied on CD, DVD or USB Stick however, this depends on the individual companies and it's recommended the client(s) checks what is included with the photographers wedding photography package before signing any contracts.

The owner of the pictures' copyright is often explicitly stated in the contract for photographic services. Without such explicit statement, the owner of the pictures' copyright will depend on the country involved as copyright laws vary from country to country.  Photographers who do not retain copyright of the images often charge more for their services. In these cases, the photographer provides the client with the digital images as part of the wedding package. The client then has unrestricted use of the images and can print any that they may desire. Similarly, there are some photographers that offer joint copyrights of the digital images so they can also have unrestricted use of the images for reasons such as advertising.

Types of photos requested may be "first look" where the bride and groom see each other before the ceremony for first reaction photos rather than first seeing each other as the brides walks down the aisle. Another type of "first look" photo may be having the photo shot of the father of the bride seeing the bride for the first time when she is just about to walk down the aisle with him.

Profession

Falling under the broader category of photographers, wedding photographers most often work on location taking photographs of wedding events on a contractual basis. According to the U.S. Bureau of Labor Statistics (BLS), 64% of photographers were self-employed as of 2018. Photographers earned a median salary of $34,000 per year as of May 2018. The number of employed photographers was expected to decline 6% between 2018 and 2028.

Couples getting married hire wedding photographers to capture the moments of their special day on film. They depend on these professionals to be punctual, attentive, and thorough – there are no second chances! While pre-wedding meetings and post-wedding work take place in an office environment, the events themselves take photographers to indoor and outdoor venues such as homes, churches, hotels, parks, and other ceremony and reception sites. Likewise, the time of each wedding sets the work schedule, with weekends and evenings being common. The number of weddings occurring in spring and summer months makes those seasons especially busy for photographers. While many photography companies exist to provide services, a significant number of wedding photographers are self-employed.

Professional organizations
Organizations such as the Professional Photographers of America (PPA), Society of Wedding and Portrait Photographers (SWPP), International Society of Professional Wedding Photographers (ISPWP), Professional Photographers of Canada (PPOC), Australian Institute of Professional Photography (AIPP),Wedding and Portrait Photographers International (WPPI) and Wedding Photojournalist Association (WPJA) support the art and business of wedding photography. WPJA awards an annual Photographer of the Year Award to recognize the best in wedding photojournalism.

In the UK there are many organizations including the Master Photographers Association (MPA) and the British Institute of Professional Photography (BIPP).

Standards and requirements for professional organizations vary, but membership often indicates a photographer is insured. Professional organizations offer training, professional competition, and support to members, as well as directory services to help with marketing and organise conventions.

South Asia

South Asian wedding photography refers to wedding photography of activities relating to Indian, Pakistani and other South Asian weddings.

Indian weddings are a Rs. 800 billion industry, which is expected to grow by 25% per annum, with a significant part dedicated to photography.

Indian weddings are significantly different from western marriages. While western marriage rituals have become common in many countries, they have not become common in India except among the Christian population. Indian weddings exhibit bold colors instead of the color white. Loud music is considered to be the norm during parts of an Indian marriage. The ceremonies are elaborate and can take considerable time even when condensed. There are various rituals like Seven Promises of Indian Marriage which are called as 'Saat Pheras' and are performed on the day of wedding. An Indian marriage is traditionally a public affair, with the bridegroom taken in a procession through the town. Even a modest Indian wedding can have several hundred participants, who are all thought to be "relatives and close family friends". By convention a photographer is required to include each guest in at least one photograph which includes the bride and the groom. These factors make photographing an Indian wedding significantly different from western weddings.

Wedding photography is now a major commercial endeavor in India that supports the bulk of the efforts for many photographers. There are photographers outside of India that specialize in Indian weddings.

Bright colors such as red and orange are considered appropriate, and the photographs often use saturated colors. Generally, Indian wedding proceedings do not pause for photographs, requiring the photographers to anticipate the next event and be ready with the right angle.

Photographs from some famous Indian weddings have been published widely in newspapers:
 Mittal wedding
 Bachchan wedding (Abhishek and Aishwarya)

Lavish marriages are often portrayed in Bollywood movies.

Photographed moments

Common moments that are recorded in Indian wedding photography include:
 Mehendi (henna) on the palms of the bride indicating she is getting ready
 The bride in a wedding dress with heavy wedding jewellery.
 Arrival of the groom on a horse in a procession, and being greeted at the door.
 The groom's entry
 The bride's entry
 The wedding mandap
 Bride and groom seated and engaged in worship
 Bride and groom walking around the sacred fire
 Special moments such as
 tying the knot
 holding hands
 tying the mangalasutra
 filling the parting of the hair with sindoor
 Portrait of the couple as a royal couple, with guests on their sides as blessing dignitaries or attendants.
 Bidaai, capturing the emotions of the bride as she leaves her father's home
 Wedding portrait: showing the newly wedded husband and wife.
 Sangeet, Maiyan and Choora are Sikh/Punjabi wedding traditions

India's "wedding season"

In India, a number of weddings take place in the "wedding season". For example, in early October, the city of Delhi can have up about 25,000 weddings a night. That can make it hard to locate wedding photographers for those who have not planned sufficiently in advance. Wedding planning in India is now a $10 billion market.  The market in 2022 is to exceed $50 billion as per Business Insider India

Indian wedding photography overseas
Indian children who have been raised overseas also expect to get married in the Indian tradition.

Photo stories of Indian weddings occasionally are published in US newspapers.

Technical and cultural challenges
Indian wedding photographers need to be aware of the cultural aspects of Indian wedding photography. They need to understand the symbolism of specific religious rituals and perhaps meet with in-laws to ask whether traditional photo compositions are desired. They also need to take into account the variation in skin tones.

India has a new breed of wedding photographers who capture candid and journalistic wedding photographs. NRI (Non-resident Indian) people who come to India for marriage tend to look for Indian photographers on the web.

Indian wedding events can often take multiple days, and may take place in multiple locations. Mehendi/Sangeet can often take place at the bride's home, whereas the wedding is held at a hotel or function hall.

Destination wedding photography 
A "destination wedding" is defined as marrying 100 or more miles from where the marrying couple currently live. The term can also refer to any wedding in which the engaged couple and/or a majority of their guests travel to attend the wedding ceremony.

Destination weddings are the fastest growing sector of the US wedding industry, currently representing more than 25% of the market. About 350,000 destination weddings take place each year accounting for $16 billion in spending.

70% of destination weddings take place in the continental USA, most popularly Florida, California, Nevada. The top three destinations outside the continental USA are the Caribbean, Mexico, and Hawaii.

Specialization and technical challenges 

Destination wedding photographers may run into challenges not typically associated with their normal weddings, ranging from location familiarity to client familiarity. Photographers may be familiar with venues if they are shooting locally; but if they travel, everything is new. For example; a Tampa wedding photographer is used to shooting a beach wedding where the sun sets over the ocean. In Miami, the sun no longer sets over the ocean. When planning for a local wedding a photographer may often meet the couple over coffee or dinner, or handle their engagement shoot. These jump start the getting-to-know-you process and create client familiarity. Typically, a destination wedding does not afford those conveniences.

Elopement photography 
Another form of destination wedding photography is photographing elopements. While the popularity of elopements has been rising for at least the last decade, the emergence of COVID-19 has cemented elopements and micro-weddings as a first choice rather than a quick, forced decision. Elopements are no longer a trend but have been entrenched as a socially acceptable alternative to a larger, traditional wedding. Having an elopement allows couples to get married in ways that are meaningful to them, an opportunity that can be hard to come by with a traditional ceremony.

Photographers who specialize in elopements take on the role of scouting scenic locations, coordinating and planning timelines, and recommending what to wear and what to pack.

See also
 Trash the dress
 Wedding planner
 Wedding videography
 Banquet photography

South Asian weddings
 Babul
 Hindu wedding
 Hindi wedding songs
 Punjabi wedding traditions
 Wedding mandap

References

Further reading